Slow Focus is the third and final studio album by Fuck Buttons, released on 22 July 2013. It peaked at number 36 on the UK Albums Chart. It was the first album released by ATP Recordings to reach the top 40 of the UK Albums Chart.

Critical reception

Upon its release, Slow Focus received critical acclaim. At Metacritic, which assigns a weighted average score out of 100 to reviews and ratings from mainstream critics, the album has received a score of 81, based on 39 reviews, indicating "universal acclaim."

AllMusic reviewer Heather Phares noted that Fuck Buttons' self production work was a measure of "how much they've come into their own" and that "Slow Focus delivers some of their most masterful and seemingly effortless music yet." Mike Madden, writing for Consequence of Sound, described it as "a seven-track ride at turns gloopy and glassy, invigorating and dark," noting that "all told, this is pretty epic stuff." Drowned in Sound critic Andrzej Lukowski observed that Slow Focus displayed "a strange, alien detachment" with an "undercurrent of menace," but stated that the album "isn’t alienating, it’s other, and it’s a pleasure to take a wander around its unfamiliar landscapes".  In his review for The Guardian where he commented that Slow Focus "seems slightly more commercial than its predecessor, although such things are obviously relative," Alexis Petridis concluded that "the only real response is to listen and gawp." NME reviewer Noel Gardner opined that it was "all-consuming and consistently impressive from the off" and stated that the band "can be proud of what they continue to achieve."

Year-End Rankings 

"N/A" indicates that the publication did not rank the works included in their year-end list.

Track Accolades 

"N/A" indicates that the publication did not rank the works included in their year-end list.

Track listing

Personnel
Credits adapted from liner notes.

 Fuck Buttons – music, production, recording, mixing
 Mat Rowlands – initial track recording
 Nina Walsh – initial track recording
 Jimmy Robertson – mix engineering
 Bob Weston – mastering
 Benjamin John Power – artwork
 Alex de Mora – photography

Charts

References

External links
 
Slow Focus on Metacritic
Slow Focus on AllMusic
Slow Focus on RYM

2013 albums
Fuck Buttons albums
ATP Recordings albums